Below is a list of ring roads from around the world.

Africa

Egypt 
 Autostrad road, Cairo
 Cairo Ring Road, Cairo

Ghana 
 Ring Road East
 Ring Road Central

Morocco 
 Rabat Ringroad, Rabat

Nigeria 
 Ring road, Benin City
 Bauchi ring road, Jos
 Ring road, Ibadan

South Africa 

 Johannesburg Ring Road
 Durban Ring Road
 Cape Town Ring Road
 Pretoria Ring Road
 Polokwane Ring Road
 Bloemfontein Ring Road
 Pietermaritzburg Ring Road

Asia

China 

 Ring roads of Beijing: 2nd, 3rd, 4th, 5th and 6th
 Ring Roads of Shanghai: Inner Ring Road, Middle Ring Road, S20 Outer Ring Expressway, G1501 Shanghai Ring Expressway
 1st, 2nd, 3rd, 4th (formerly 1st Chengdu bypass highway) and 5th Ring Roads (formerly 2nd Chengdu bypass highway), currently exist in Chengdu and a new 3rd bypass highway (6th ring road) is under construction and scheduled for completion in 2017.
 G0102 Changchun Ring Expressway
 Inner Ring Road, Outer Ring Road, Guangzhou
 Shenyang Ring Expressway, Shenyang
 Tangshan Ring Expressway, Tangshan
 Inner, Middle and Outer Ring Roads, Tianjin
 The second and the third ring roads in Xi'an
 Inner Ring Road, Second Ring Road and Third Ring Road of Wuhan

Hong Kong 

In Hong Kong, a circular motorway, Route 9, as known as New Territories Circular Road, circles the New Territories and connects all the towns to the north of New Kowloon.

India 
 Outer Ring Road, Largest in the nation, about 158 km, 8-lane ring road Inner Road Road, Hyderabad
 Inner and Outer Ring Roads and Elevated Beltways, Chennai
 Central, Inner Ring Road, Outer Ring Road, and Peripheral Ring Roads, Bangalore
 Delhi Ring Road, Delhi Outer Ring Road and the Western Peripheral Expressway, Eastern Peripheral Expressway National Capital Region
 Bandra-Worli Sea Link and the proposed Western Freeway Sea Link, Mumbai
 Inner Central Ring Road (Old Padra Road/Vadodara Road – Race Course Road – Sarabhai Road – Sayaji Path – VIP Road – New VIP Road – Ring Road – (Ajwa – Waghodia) – (Waghodia – Dabhoi) – (Soma Talav – Tarsali) – (Sussen – Tarsali)), Outer Ring Road/NH48 bypass Chhani – Makarpura, Vadodara
 Ranchi Ring Road, Ranchi
 Outer Ring Road, Nagpur
 Outer Ring Road, Amaravati
 Jaipur Ring Road, Jaipur
 Pune Ring Road, Pune
 Coimbatore bypass, Coimbatore
 Mysore Ring Road, Mysore
 Jodhpur Ring Road, Jodhpur
 Outer Ring Road, Trivandrum
 Sardar Patel Ring Road, Ahmedabad
 Gulbarga Ring Road, Gulbarga
 Rourkela Ring Road, Rourkela
 Mandalsera Ring Road, Bageshwar
 Varanasi Ring Road, Varanasi
 Surat Ring Road, Surat
 Tumkur Ring Road, Tumkur.
 Thanjavur Ring Road, Thanjavur
 Tiruchy Bypass and Semi Ring Road, Tiruchirappalli
 Ring Road, Indore

Indonesia 
 Jakarta Inner Ring Road
 Jakarta Outer Ring Road 1
 Jakarta Outer Ring Road 2 (One section completed)
 Bogor Outer Ring Road
 Bandung Ring Road (Padaleunyi Toll Road)
 Semarang Ring Road (Arteri Semarang Toll Road)
 Surabaya (Gresik – Gempol Toll Road)

Iran 
 Azadegan Expressway: Tehran Southern and Western Ringway
 Basij Expressway: Tehran Eastern Ringway
 Agharabparast Expressway – Shahid Radanipour Expressway – Chamran Expressway – Kharrazi Expressway – Shahid Keshvari Expressway – Shahid Meysami Expressway – Habibollahi Expressway – Sayyad Shirazi Expressway – Mirza Kouchak Khan Expressway – Aghababaei Expressway – Shohadaye Soffeh Expressway – Kayyam-Khorram Expressway: These are known as Esfahan's third Traffic Ring
 Shahre Rey Ring Expressway
 Tehran Second Ring Expressway
 Shiraz Ringway
 Tabriz Northern Freeway
 Tabriz Southern Freeway

Japan

Fukuoka 
 Expressway
 Fukuoka Expressway Circle Route (35 km, 60–80 km/h)

Nagoya 
 Expressway
 Nagoya Expressway Ring Route (10.3 km, 50–60 km/h)

Osaka 
 Expressway
 Hanshin Expressway Loop Route (10.3 km, 50–60 km/h)

Sendai Metropolitan Area 
 Expressway
 Gurutto Sendai (58.9 km, 70–100 km/h)

Greater Tokyo Area 

 Expressway
 Tokyo Expressway
 Shuto Expressway C1 Inner Circular Route (14.8 km, 50 km/h)
 Shuto Expressway C2 Central Circular Route
 Tokyo-Gaikan Expressway
 Ken-O Expressway (Includes Chiba-Tōgane Road, Shinshōnan Bypass, Yokohama Ring Expressway)
 Tokyo Bay Ring Road (Shuto Expressway B Bayshore Route, Tokyo Bay Aqua-Line)
 Kantō Ring Road (Kita-Kantō Expressway, Jōshin-etsu Expressway, Chūbu-Ōdan Expressway)
 National Highway
 Japan National Route 16
 Japan National Route 298 (Parallel to Tokyo-Gaikan Expressway)
 Japan National Route 357
 Local Highway
 Tokyo Ring 1 (Uchibori-dori, Eitai-dori, Hibiya-dori, Harumi-dori)
 Tokyo Ring 2 (Sotobori-dori, Shin-ohashi-dori, Tokyo Highway 483, Tokyo Highway 484)
 Tokyo Ring 3 (Kiyosumi-dori, Kasuga-dori, Gaien-higashi-dori, Kototoi-dori, Mito Highway, Mitsume-dori)
 Tokyo Ring 4 (Gaien-nishi-dori, Tokyo Highway 437, Meiji-dori, Maruhachi-dori)
 Tokyo Ring 5–1, 5–2 (Meiji-dori)
 Tokyo Ring 6 (Yamate-dori)
 Tokyo Ring 7 (Kannana-dori)
 Tokyo Ring 8 (Kanpachi-dori)
 Tokyo Bay Ring Road
 Yokohama Ring 1 (Yokohama Highway 83, Kanagawa Highway 201, Yokohama Highway 84)
 Yokohama Ring 2
 Yokohama Ring 3
 Yokohama Ring 4 (Kanagawa Highway 23, Kanyon)
 Utsunomiya Ring Road
 Takasaki Ring Road

Malaysia

George Town 

 George Town Inner Ring Road
 Penang Middle Ring Road
 Penang Outer Ring Road

Johor Bahru 
 Johor Bahru Inner Ring Road
 Johor Bahru Middle Ring Road, comprising:
 Pasir Gudang Highway
 Johor Bahru Parkway
 Johor Bahru Outer Ring Road, comprising:
 Second Link Expressway
 Senai–Desaru Expressway

Kuala Lumpur 

 Kuala Lumpur Inner Ring Road
 Kuala Lumpur Middle Ring Road 1
 Kuala Lumpur Middle Ring Road 2

Others 

 Butterworth Outer Ring Road
 Kajang Dispersal Link Expressway
 Segamat Inner Ring Road

Nepal 
 Kathmandu Ring Road

Pakistan 
 Lahore Ring Road
 Peshawar Ring Road

Philippines

Metro Manila 

 C-1
 C-2
 C-3
 C-4
 C-5
 C-6

Thailand

Bangkok 
 Outer Ring Road – Kanchanaphisek Road – Motorway route 9, a complete ring road (grade-separated and controlled access) comprising:
 Western Outer Ring Road, Bang Pa In to Suk Sawad
 Eastern Outer Ring Road, Bang Phli to Bang Pa In, a partly tolled section
 Southern Outer Ring Road, Bang Phli to Suk Sawad, a viaduct/bridge and fully tolled section
 Inner Ring Road – a complete ring road comprising
 Ratchadaphisek Road (eastern portion)
 Wong Sawang Road (northern portion)
 Charan Sanit Wong Road (western portion)
 Bangkok Expressway – a fully tolled, complete ring (grade-separated and controlled access) comprising
 Port – Dao Khanong Expressway (southern portion)
 Phaya Thai – Bangkhlo Expressway (western portion)
 Chalerm Mahanakhorn Expressway (eastern portion)
 Asoke – Rachadapisek Expressway (northern portion)

Northern Thailand 
 Ayutthaya – Route 32, 347 and 356, a complete outer ring road
 Ayutthaya – U Thong Road, a complete inner ring road, surrounding old city
 Chiang Mai – Route 121, a complete outer ring road
 Chiang Mai – Route 11 and 1141, a partial inner ring road
 Phitsanulok – Route 126, a complete ring road linking routes 11, 12 and 117
 Suphanburi – Route 357, a complete ring road linking routes 321, 322, 329 and 340.
 Saraburi – Route 362, a complete ring road linking routes 1 and 2.

North Eastern Thailand 
 Buriram – Route 288, a complete ring road linking routes 218, 219 and 226
 Khon Kaen – Route 230, a complete ring road linking Route 2 and Route 12
 Roi Et – Route 232, a complete ring road linking routes 23, 214 and 215
 Ubon Ratchathani – Route 231, a complete ring road linking routes 23, 24, 212, 217 and 226
 Udon Thani – Route 216 'By pass Road', a complete ring road linking Route 2 with Routes 22 and 216

South Eastern Thailand 
 Chonburi – Route 361, a partial ring road linking Route 3 with routes 315 and 344

Southern Thailand 
 Surat Thani – complete ring road consisting of routes 401, 417 and 420
 Trang – Route 419, a complete ring road linking routes 4, 403 and 404

Turkey 
 Otoyol 20 circles around the capital city Ankara

Singapore 

 Outer Ring Road System, comprising (from east to west):
 Still Road South
 Still Road
 Jalan Eunos
 Hougang Avenue 3
 Bartley Road
 Braddell Road
 Lornie Road
 Adam Road
 Farrer Road
 Queensway
 Portsdown Avenue
 Yishun Ring Road, a ring road located in Yishun
 A ring road in Toa Payoh comprising Lorong 1 Toa Payoh and Lorong 6 Toa Payoh
 Bukit Panjang Ring Road, a ring road located in Bukit Panjang
 Minor ring roads in Woodlands
 Woodlands Circle
 Woodlands Ring Road

South Korea

Seoul 
 Seoul Ring Expressway (Route 100), a complete outer ring road of motorway standard.
 Inner ring road, a complete ring consisting:
 Naebu Beltway (Route 66)
 Dongbu Arterial Road (Route 61)
 Gangbyeonbuk-ro (Route 70)

Daejeon 
 Daejon Ring Road, a complete ring road consisting:
 Daejeon Nambu Sunhwan Expressway (route 300), southern portion
 Tongyeong–Daejeon Expressway (route 35), eastern portion
 Gyeongbu Expressway (route 1), northern portion
 Honam Expressway (route 251), western portion

Gwangju 
 Ring Road, a complete ring road consisting:
 Honam Expressway (route 25), northern portion
 Route 77, the eastern, western and southern portion

Vietnam

Ho Chi Minh City
 Partial ring road consisting:
 National Route 1 (QL 1A), northern portion
 Nguyen Van Linh, southern portion
 Vanh Dai, incomplete eastern portion

Hanoi
 Partial Inner Ring road consisting:
 Buoi, Lang, Truong Chinh and Vinh Tuy Bridge
 Outer Ring Road consisting:
 Ring Road 3, Pham Van Dong, National Highway 5 (QL 5), Thanh Tri Bridge and Nguyen Van Linh

Australia

Australia 
Australian Coast or nearby – Highway 1, ring road surrounds all of Australia

New South Wales 
 Sydney – Sydney Orbital Network, complete ring road consisting of 11 Motorways
 Sydney – A9 (Sydney), a partial outer ring road
 Newcastle – Newcastle Inner City Bypass, an inner partial ring road

Queensland 
 Brisbane – Orbital, a partial ring road comprising:
 Gateway Motorway (M1), eastern portion
 Logan Motorway (M2), southern portion
 Western Bypass, a proposed western portion
 Brisbane – Inner City Bypass an inner partial ring road
 Townsville – Townsville Ring Road, a partial ring road comprising:
 Douglas Arterial Road
 Mackay – Mackay Ring Road, a partial ring road
 Toowoomba – Toowoomba Bypass, a partial ring road

Victoria 
 Melbourne – Metropolitan Ring Road, a partial ring road comprising:
 Western Ring Road (M80)
 Metropolitan Ring Road (M80)
 EastLink (M3)
 Melbourne – Outer Metropolitan Ring Road, a partial outer ring road (proposed)
 Geelong – Geelong Ring Road, a partial ring road

Western Australia 
 Perth Inner Orbital:
 Reid Highway (northern)
 Tonkin Highway (eastern)
 Leach Highway (southern)
 Perth Outer Orbital:
 Roe Highway (eastern)
 Roe Highway (southern)
 Perth Bunbury Highway (proposed outer bypass), Bunbury

Europe

Austria 
 Gürtel (Outer Ring), Vienna
 Ringstraße (Inner Ring), Vienna

Azerbaijan 
 Baku Ring, Baku

Belarus 
 Minsk Automobile Ring Road (MKAD), Minsk

Belgium 

 R0 (Brusselse Ring), Brussels
 R1 (Antwerpse Ring), Antwerp
 R2 (Wider ringroad, not completely built), Antwerp
 R3, Charleroi
 R4, Ghent
 R5, Mons
 R7, Liège
 R8, Kortrijk
 R9 (smaller ring), Charleroi
 R42 (smaller ring), Sint-Niklaas

Bulgaria 
 Sofia ring road

Croatia 
 Zagreb bypass (A2, A3, A4)
 A second,  bypass (proposed signing is A15) was announced to be part of the 2009–2012 four-year construction plan)
 Rijeka bypass (A7)

Cyprus 
 Larnaca Beltway – A3

Czech Republic 
 R1 expressway (outer ring road), Prague (partially completed)
 Městský okruh (MO) (inner ring road), Prague (partially completed)
 Road I/31 (Hradec Králové)
 Big City Ring (Velký městský okruh) in Brno
 Brno City Ring (Brněnský městský okruh, vnitřní městský okruh), the inner ring in Brno
 the three old Prague rings (I, II, III) and many rings in other cities are not special express ring roads but routes signed on common streets and roads

Denmark 
 Copenhagen City Ring (O2) and Outer Rings O3, O4, Motorringveje 3 og 4)

Estonia 
 Tallinn ring road (Tallinna ringtee), around Tallinn, Estonian national road 11
 Tartu ring road (Ringtee), around Tartu, most of it is part of Tallinn–Tartu–Võru–Luhamaa road (E263)
 Põlva ring road (Põlva ringtee), around Põlva, Estonian national road 87
 Kuressaare ring road (Kuressaare ringtee), around Kuressaare, Estonian national road 76

Finland 
 Kehä 0 (Ring 0), a conceptual approach to routing traffic away from the very centre of the city, to develop greater pedestrian access areas in the centre, the so-called "carless centre". Though this is the least legitimate in the sense of what is commonly thought as a ring road, merely consisting of ways to route traffic, it differs from the other ring roads in that it would consist of a fully circular network of routes around a focal point, rather than I, II and III, which are properly only semicircular, being as they are, limited by the sea on one side.
 Hakamäentie, by-passes inner city. The central part is built, remaining parts uniting Turku motorway with E75
 Kehä I (Ring 1), encircling Helsinki while also passing through Espoo, for local traffic
 Kehä II (Ring 2), traffic loadout highway through Espoo, for local traffic (Kehä II is not an actual ring road but only a stub – the complete ring is not yet even planned)
 Kehä III (Ring 3), bypass of Helsinki, part of E18, encircling Helsinki through Vantaa, Espoo and Kirkkonummi, for local traffic and long-distance traffic
 Turun kehätie (Turku Ring Road), encircling city of Turku and bypasses through Turku, Raisio, Lieto and Kaarina.
 Tampere Ring Road, encircling city of Tampere and bypasses Tampere, Pirkkala, Nokia and Ylöjärvi.

France 
 Périphérique, Paris
 A86 autoroute ("Le Superpériphérique"), Paris
 A104 autoroute ("La Francilienne"), Île-de-France region.
 Périphérique de Toulouse (A620, A612), Toulouse
 Boulevard périphérique de Lyon (A7, N383), Lyon. West segment is still under construction.
 Rocade de Bordeaux : (A630, N230), Bordeaux, Longest beltway of France.
 Boulevard périphérique de Caen (N814), Caen
 Boulevard périphérique de Lille (A22, A25, N352) Lille
 Boulevard périphérique de Nantes (N8444, N249), Nantes.
 Rocade de Rennes (N136), Rennes

Germany 
 Berliner Ring (A 10), Berlin
 Mitteldeutsche Schleife (A 9, A 14, A 38, A 143), Leipzig, Halle
 Inner City Ring Road in Leipzig, also called Promenadenring (Ring of promenades)
 Dortmunder Ring (A 1, A 2, A 45), Dortmund
 Cologne Inner Ring (Bundesstraße 9), Cologne
 Cologne Outer Ring (A 1, A 3, A 4), Cologne
 Münchener Ring (A 99), Munich
 Giessener Ring, (A 485, A 480, B 49, B 429), Giessen

Greece 
 Motorway 5 (Greece), Patras Beltway, Patras
 Attiki Odos, Athens (A6)
 Thessaloniki Inner Ring Road (EO11, A25, A123)
 Greek National Road 6 (EO6) (Larissa Beltway), Larissa

Athens is encircled by the system of Attiki Odos motorway with three main avenues, forming a Π around the Athens Basin. To the northern side, the main section (number 6) connecting Elefsina shipyards-industrial zone with the Athens International Airport in Spata and counts about 50 km. To the western side, Aigaleo Avenue, encircling Mount Aigaleo and to the eastern side, the Hymettus Ring. As supplementary avenues there are also NATO Avenue, running across the Elefsina Basin next to Mount Aigaleo, Katehaki Avenue, connecting NE (Papagou) and SE (Ilioupoli) suburbs of Athens aligned with Mount Hymettus and finally Varis-Koropiou Avenue, connecting the vicinity of Athens International Airport and the SE coast of Athens, near the suburb of Voula, in the back side of Mount Hymettus. To the south side (coast), Poseidonos Avenue (Or "Paraliaki (Παραλιακή): Greek for "Coastal (Road)") runs from Piraeus (Faliro Interchange) to Voula, aligned with the coast, until it meets Varis-Koropiou and then it continues to the countryside Sounio Avenue, towards Sounio and Lavrio.

The quality of the encircling system varies from motorway of high standards and fully computerised control and service (northern section of Attiki Odos) to more simple two-lanes avenue, like Aigaleo Avenue. Most of the system, maybe except the mountainous parts (Aigaleo, Katehaki and Hymettus Ring), is a high-speed traffic system of roads. Usually the most speedy traffic is noticed on the coastal Poseidonos Avenue, thus making it need increased attention.

Hungary 
 Motorway M0 (Budapest)
 Section of Motorway M35 bypassing Debrecen

Iceland 
 Route 1, which circles the entire country

Ireland 
All ring roads listed are not arranged from previously existing roads.
 Dublin: M50 motorway (Dublin Port Tunnel, Northern Cross Route, Western Parkway, South Eastern Motorway)
 Limerick: Limerick Southern Ring Road (end of N7 route)
 Cork: N40 Cork South Ring Road
 Kilkenny: Kilkenny Ring Road (part N10/N77 routes)
 Galway: Galway City Outer Bypass (planned) (part of the N6 road route)
 Waterford: Waterford Bypass [under construction] (part of the N25 route)

Dublin has three generations of partial ring roads. Due to its location on the sea, there is no complete ring road as yet. with the combined South Circular Road and North Circular Road forming the oldest, and inner pair dating from the 19th century.

The M50 motorway forms the middle, most complete and most heavily trafficked (85k-90k cars/day) ring road with an eventual plan to form a complete ring via an undersea tunnel or bridge.

The Outer Ring Road forms the newest partial ring, running along the west of the cities outer suburbs. Eventual plans are to link it to sections of the R121 road which provides a similar service in the north west of the city, with land being reserved for this.

In addition, Dublin City Council has signed two "orbital routes" consisting of existing roads, but following these requires turning at many junctions.

Italy 

 Grande Raccordo Anulare, Rome
 Tangenziale, Milan (A50-A51 – A52)
 Tangenziale di Padova
 Tangenziale di Pavia (A54)
 Tangenziale di Torino (A55)
 Tangenziale di Napoli (A56)
 Tangenziale di Venezia (A57)
 Tangenziale di Bologna (RA 1)
 Tangenziale di Catania (RA 15)

Netherlands 

 Ring Amsterdam (A10), Amsterdam
 Ring Rotterdam (A4/A15/A16/A20), Rotterdam
 Ring Utrecht (A2/A12/A27/Zuilensering), Utrecht
 Centrumring Amsterdam (S100)
 Ring Almelo
 Ring Almere
 Ring Alkmaar
 Ring Alphen aan den Rijn
 Ring Apeldoorn
 Ring Barendrecht
 Ring Den Haag
 Ring Eindhoven (inner) and Randweg Eindhoven (A2/A67, outer; incomplete)
 Ring Enschede
 Ring Franeker
 Ring Groningen, Groningen
 Ring 's-Hertogenbosch
 Ring Leeuwarden
 Ring Sneek
 Ring Spijkenisse
 Ring Zwolle
 Ring Zoetermeer
 Ringweg Bruinisse
 Ringweg Kats
 Ringweg Harderwijk
 Buitenring Parkstad

The Hague is circled by four ring roads:
 The "Ring" is the main ring road, roughly 34 km long; It is also called the "International ring".
 Around the city centre, there is the "CentrumRING", roughly 11 km long.

Norway 
 Oslo Ringveg, Oslo (three ring roads going around the city centre, with a mutual road (E18) in southernmost part of the city)
 Ringveg Vest, Bergen (Connecting RV 580 and RV 555)
 Ringveg Øst, Bergen (Not built E39 Bypassing Bergen city centre E16 bypassing Arna)

Poland 

 Gliwice ring: A1 autostrada, A4 autostrada
 Katowice agglomeration ring: A1 autostrada, A4 autostrada, Expressway S1
 Kraków ring: A4 autostrada, Expressway S7, Expressway S52
 Lublin ring: Expressway S17, Expressway S19
 Łódź ring: A1 autostrada, A2 autostrada, Expressway S8, Expressway S14
 Piotrków Trybunalski ring: A1 autostrada, Expressway S8, Expressway S12
 Poznań ring: A2 autostrada, Expressway S5, Expressway S11
 Rzeszów ring: A4 autostrada, Expressway S19
 Warsaw ring: Expressway S2, Expressway S7, Expressway S8, Expressway S17
 Wrocław ring: A4 autostrada, A8 autostrada
 Szczecin ring: A6 autostrada, Expressway S3, Expressway S6
 Toruń ring: A1 autostrada, Expressway S10
 Tricity (Gdańsk, Sopot, Gdynia) ring: Obwodnica Trójmiejska

Portugal 

 VCI, inner ring road in Porto
 CREP, outer ring road in Porto
 Segunda Circular, inner ring road in Lisbon
 CRIL, inner ring road of Lisbon's suburbs
 CREL, outer ring road of Greater Lisbon

Romania 
 Centura București (CB, Bucharest Inner Ringroad) , national road class around Bucharest, currently upgrading to expressway standard;
 Autostrada Centura București (ACB, Bucharest Outer Ringroad), a motorway-class road circling Bucharest, currently in planning stages
 Sibiu bypass: The 17.5 km of motorway as a part of A1 motorway forming a partial beltway around Sibiu was fully completed on August 30, 2011.
 Autostrada Centura Constanţa (Constanţa West Bypass motorway), part of A4 , currently under construction, estimated completion – end of 2011

Russia 
 Saint Petersburg Ring Road, Saint Petersburg

Moscow, Russia has three beltways:
 MKAD — Moscow Ring Road, which follows city borders, is approximately 

Moscow Central Ring Road is a planned road which will consist of parts of Moscow Small Ring and Moscow Big Ring.

Inside the Moscow city limits there are three ring roads: the central Boulevard Ring, which is generally two lanes each way with narrow tree-lined parks between the carriage ways; the Garden Ring, which has at least four lanes each way and no gardens; and the Third Ring Road, which was constructed in the late 1990s and early 2000s and combined existing roads and new highways. A fourth ring, between the Third Ring and the MKAD, is planned.
 Third Ring Road (Moscow)
 MKAD, Moscow
 Chelyabinsk Ring, Chelyabinsk
 Kaliningrad Road Ring, Kaliningrad

Slovenia 
 Ljubljana bypass (Obvoznica)

Serbia 

 Belgrade bypass (Obilaznica oko Beograda, under construction, total length is 69 kilometers) (A1)
 Novi Sad bypass (A1)
 Niš bypass (A1 / A4)

Spain 

Madrid, Spain is served by three beltways:
 M-50, which was planned as a full ring but is not "closed" as of 2008, though projects by the Autonomous Community of Madrid to connect both ends through a tunnel are being aired.

This proliferation of orbital motorways is partially due to the traditional high radiality of the Spanish highway network, which routed most cross-country traffic through Madrid.

Other Spanish beltways include:
 B10 motorway, also known as Ronda Litoral coastal lower (south part) ring road in Barcelona (Catalonia)
 B20 motorway, also known as Ronda de Dalt, upper (north parth) ring road in Barcelona (Catalonia)
 B30 motorway, outer half-ring road in Barcelona (Catalonia)
 B40 motorway, the outermost ring road in Barcelona (Catalonia).(In project, known as "Quart Cinturó" (Fourth beltway))
 See also List of autopistas and autovías in Spain

Sweden 
 Stockholm Ring Road (half-completed, eastern section under feasibility study)
 Malmö Inner Ring Road
 Malmö Outer Ring Road
 Linköping Inner Ring (C-ring) and Outer Ring (Y-ring)

Turkey 
Most of Turkish metropolitans have beltways with motorway standard.
 İstanbul: Has three beltways named as Otoyol 1 (inner beltway), Otoyol 2 (outer beltway) and Otoyol 7 (outest beltway). Also Kennedy Avenue and Eurasia Tunnel forms a some-what ring road in the most southern section of the city along the Marmara Sea coast.
 Ankara: Otoyol 20
 İzmir: Altınyol, Otoyol 30
 Bursa: Otoyol 5 and Otoyol 22
 Antalya: Dumlupınar Bulvarı (West), Gazi Bulvarı (North) are in use. A new beltway project is planning on stage.
 Gaziantep: Otoyol 54
 Tekirdağ: D110
 Aydın: Otoyol 31
 Manisa: D565 and D250
 Çanakkale: D550
 Adapazarı: D100 and D650
 Edirne: Otoyol 3

Ukraine 
Kyiv has 3 beltways:
 Small Beltway – completed
 Great Beltway – only west half-belt is complete, through further extension is frozen.
 Second Great Beltway – currently under construction.

Kharkiv has one of oldest ring roads in Ukraine. It was built in 1960–1970s. The road has been maintained in preparation for UEFA Euro 2012.

Other cities that have ring roads include:
 Ivano-Frankivsk
 Khust
 Kropyvnytskyi
 Lviv
 Odessa

United Kingdom 
 Ashford, Ashford Ringway was formerly a one-way circuit of the town centre consisting of 3 to 4 lanes and part of the A292. The Elwick Road and Forge Lane sections now form part of the town's shared space scheme with an aim of taming the traffic and promoting commercial growth. Somerset Road is now a dual carriageway and Wellseley Road and Station Road are now a single carriageway section of the A2042.
 Aylesbury, the A4157 road in Aylesbury goes past Stocklake and Weedon Road near the Bicester Road near Fairford Leys
 Basingstoke, Basingstoke Ringway is a complete loop around the town centre; it is a dual carriageway except for a small unfinished section on the south-western side.
 Birmingham:
 Birmingham Box orbital motorway (parts of M42, M6 and M5 motorways)
 Outer (A4040) ring road (uses redesignated old roads, to the north it continues beyond the Box)
 Intermediate (A4540) ring road, Middleway
 Former inner (A4400) ring road reduced; now two through routes
 Bradford, A6177
 Coventry, A4053
 Edinburgh, A720 Edinburgh City Bypass
 Glasgow, Glasgow Inner Ring Road
 Kidderminster, not completed
 Leeds:
 Leeds Outer Ring Road, M621, M1, M62
 Leeds Inner Ring Road
 Leicester:
 Leicester W/N 1st Orbital M1/A46 (Leicester Western Bypass)
 Leicester Ring Road
 Leicester Central Ring
 Liverpool, Queens Drive, the UK's first ring road, conceived as early as 1860 by James Newlands; construction began in 1903 under his successor John Alexander Brodie.
 London:
 London Orbital Motorway or M25 motorway (including A282)
 North Circular and South Circular
 London (Inner) Ring Road
 Manchester:
 M60 Orbital Motorway: Created by the amalgamation and renumbering of several existing motorways (M62, M63 and M66) and some new build to create a complete loop around the city of Manchester and seven neighbouring Metropolitan Boroughs to form one of the UK's busiest stretches of road.
 Manchester Inner Ring Road: This runs around the city centres of Manchester and Salford. To the south, one third is elevated motorway (the Mancunian Way), with the remainder being at-grade urban clearway.
 Oxford, Oxford Ring Road
 Paignton, Torquay, A380 road
 Paisley, Renfrewshire
 Reading, Berkshire, Inner Distribution Road
 Redditch, B4160
 Sheffield:
 Sheffield Outer Ring Road
 Sheffield Inner Ring Road
 Stourbridge, A491
 Walsall, A4148
 Watford, A411
 Wolverhampton, A4150

North America

Canada

Alberta 
 Stoney Trail, Calgary
 Anthony Henday Drive, Edmonton
 Inner Ring Road (170 Street, Whitemud Drive, Wayne Gretzky Drive, Yellowhead Trail), Edmonton

British Columbia 
 South Fraser Perimeter Road, Metro Vancouver

Manitoba 
 Perimeter Highway, Winnipeg

New Brunswick 
 Route 15, Moncton

Newfoundland and Labrador 
 Outer Ring Road, Metro St. John's
 Pitts Memorial Drive, Metro St. John's
 Lewin Parkway, Corner Brook

Nova Scotia 
 Nova Scotia Highway 111, Dartmouth, Nova Scotia, in the Halifax Regional Municipality
 Nova Scotia Highway 125, Cape Breton Regional Municipality

Ontario 
 Lincoln M. Alexander Parkway and Red Hill Valley Parkway, Hamilton
 Southwest and Southeast Bypasses and Northwest Bypass, Sudbury (partial)
 Thunder Bay Expressway, Thunder Bay (partial)
 Highway 407 and Highway 35/115, Greater Toronto Area

Quebec 
 Montreal
 Autoroute 30, South Shore of Montreal
 Autoroute 640, North Shore of Laval – not completed and probably won't be completed from Oka to the A-40 near Hudson and from Charlemagne to the A-30 near Varennes
 Quebec City
 Autoroute 40, north of Quebec City
 Sherbrooke
 Autoroute 410, entire highway — north leg
 Autoroute 10, exits 141 to 143 — northwest leg
 Autoroute 610, entire highway — west & south legs

Saskatchewan 
 Ring Road, Regina
 Circle Drive, Saskatoon

Mexico 
 Anillo Periférico, Mexico City. The beltway gained major media attention when the Mexico City mayor, Andrés Manuel López Obrador, started a project to turn a southern section of the ring into a two-story highway. The second floor was finished in 2006.

 Circuito Interior, Mexico City. The inner beltway inside Mexico City proper.
 Libramiento Arco Norte a toll road partly under construction being built around Mexico City.
 Periférico Manuel Gómez Morín, Guadalajara, Jalisco. The ring has a gap: it starts at the Federal Highway 44, circles around the city as a 3+3 lane highway, becomes a 2+2 lane road in the Tonalá municipality, and ends abruptly in the Federal Highway 90.
 Macrolibramiento, Guadalajara, Jalisco. An outer beltway that bypasses the city from the Zapotlanejo expressway to the Tepic expressway with the goal of relieving the current beltway from its heavy cargo traffic.
 Anillo Interno 210, Monterrey, Nuevo León. The beltway is almost a complete 3+3 lane highway. In clockwise it starts in the intersection with Avenida Constitución and continues until Avenida Gonzalitos – Fidel Velazquez, then Avenida Nogalar, Avenida Los Angeles, until the intersection Churubusco – Avenida Constitución. The beltway is a complete freeway except for the part from Avenida Los Angeles – Churubusco until Avenida Constitución (east part of the Beltway).
 Periférico Ecológico, Puebla, Puebla. An incomplete ringroad which passes through most of the municipalities that conform the Metropolitan Area of Puebla.
 Tijuana-Rosarito Autopista, Tijuana, Baja California. Currently under construction, it will form a bypass around Tijuana connecting Federal Highway 2 to Federal Highway 1 in Ensenada.

United States

Alabama 
 Interstate 459, partial beltway around Birmingham
 Ross Clark Circle, a surface street (as opposed to a controlled-access highway) encircling Dothan—the first such 'ring road' in the United States, opening in 1958. Also known as State Route 210
 State Route 152, surface street encircling Montgomery
 Boll Weevil Circle, a surface street encircling Enterprise

Arkansas 
 Interstate 430 and Interstate 440, completed segments of a planned full beltway around Little Rock

Arizona 

 State Loop Route 101, Phoenix Metropolitan Area
 State Loop Route 202, Phoenix Metropolitan Area
 State Loop Route 303, Phoenix Metropolitan Area

California 
 Interstate 405, Interstate 605, and Interstate 210 a partial loop around the Los Angeles Basin
 State Route 54, State Route 125, and State Route 52, a partial loop around San Diego
 Interstate 80 and Capital City Freeway, Sacramento
 State Route 85, State Route 237, Interstate 880, and U.S. Route 101, forms a loop around Silicon Valley
 Interstate 280 and Interstate 680, partial beltway around the San Francisco Bay Area
 U.S. Route 101 (Via Interstate 80 in San Francisco), Interstate 280 (California) (Via the Alemany Maze), Interstate 880 (Via Interstate 280) and Interstate 80 (Via the San Francisco-Oakland Bay Bridge, forms a loop around the San Francisco Peninsula and the East Bay (San Francisco Bay Area)
 Grand Boulevard is a circular surface street that circles Corona, California

Colorado 
 Interstate 225, Aurora
 Colorado State Highway 470, E-470, and the Northwest Parkway, Denver Metropolitan Area

Connecticut 
 Interstate 91/Interstate 291/Interstate 491 (unfinished Hartford Beltway)

District of Columbia 

 Interstate 495 (Capital Beltway) (Primarily in Maryland and Virginia)

Florida 
 Interstate 295, Jacksonville
 Interstate 10/State Road 263, Tallahassee
 State Road 417/429/451, Orlando (planned beltway system)
 State Road 570, Lakeland
 State Road 826 (de facto), Miami
 Homestead Extension of Florida's Turnpike (de facto), Miami
 Tampa Bay Area Beltway (proposed)

Georgia 
 Interstate 285 (Atlanta Bypass), Atlanta
 Interstate 520/Interstate 20 (Bobby Jones Expressway/Carl Sanders Highway) Augusta
 State Route 10 Loop, Athens
 State Route 120 Loop (Marietta Parkway), Marietta (a surface street)

Hawaii 
 Route 11, Route 19, and Route 190 form Hawaii Belt Road on the Island of Hawaii. It is the largest completed beltway system in the United States & its territories. This beltway is officially called Māmalahoa Highway.
 Route 160 in West of the Island of Hawaii
 Route 270(ʻAkoni Pule Highway) in North of Island of Hawaii
 Route 30(Honoapi'ilani Highway) in West Maui
 Route 36 and Route 360 form the Hana Highway in North, Northeast, East, and Southeast of the Island of Maui.
 Route 377, Kula, Maui
 Route 450(Kamehameha V Highway) in Southeast and East of the Island of Molokai
 Route 540(Halewili Road) in South Kauai
 Route 581 in East Kauai
 Route 72(Kalanianaʻole Highway) on Oahu
 Route 80, Route 83, Route 99 and Route 830 form Kamehameha Highway on Oahu(the most populated of all the Hawaiian Islands).
 Hauula Homestead Road, Hauula, Oahu
 Naniloa Loop, Laie, Oahu

Illinois 
 Interstate 80/Interstate 280, Quad Cities (also enters Iowa)
 Interstate 294, Chicago
 Interstate 474, Peoria

Indiana 
 Interstate 465, Indianapolis
 Interstate 69/Interstate 469, Fort Wayne
 Interstate 265/Interstate 65/Interstate 264/Interstate 64, Jeffersonville

Iowa 
 Interstate 35, Interstate 80, U.S. Route 65, and Iowa Highway 5, a continuous beltway around Des Moines
 Interstate 80 and Interstate 280, Quad Cities also enters Illinois

Kansas 
 Interstate 435, Kansas City (second-longest beltway in the United States)
 Interstate 235, Wichita
 Interstate 470, Topeka

Kentucky 
 Ring Road, Elizabethtown (a surface street)
 Interstate 264 (Henry Watterson Expressway), Louisville
 Interstate 265 (Gene Snyder Freeway), Louisville
 Man o' War Boulevard, Lexington
 New Circle Road, Lexington (mostly freeway, partly surface street)

Louisiana 
 Interstate 55, Interstate 10 and Interstate 12 around New Orleans
 Interstate 220, Shreveport
 Interstate 210, Lake Charles
 Ambassador Caffery Parkway, Lafayette (partially constructed boulevard loop around Lafayette)
 The LRX or Lafayette Regional Xpressway (access-controlled toll road which serves the Lafayette metropolitan area)

Maryland 
 Interstate 695 (also known as the Baltimore Beltway, officially designated as the McKeldin Beltway), Baltimore
 Interstate 495 (Capital Beltway), Washington, D.C.

Massachusetts 
 Massachusetts Route 128, cosigned with Interstate 95, Boston (not fully circumferential due to city's seaside location)
 Interstate 495, Boston (not fully circumferential due to city's seaside location)
 I-495 forms part of a complete beltway around Lawrence. I-495 runs along this beltway between exits 40 and 47. The rest of the beltway is formed by Interstate 93 between exits 44 and 48 on that highway, and the entirety of Route 213 (AKA the "Loop Connector", which lent its name to a strip mall in Methuen).

Michigan 
 Interstate 275/Interstate 696, Detroit
 Interstate 96/Interstate 196/M-6, Grand Rapids
 Interstate 94/M-14/U.S. Route 23, Ann Arbor
 Interstate 96/Interstate 69/Interstate 496/U.S. Route 127, Lansing
 M-185, Mackinac Island

Minnesota 
 Interstate 94, Interstate 494, and Interstate 694, Minneapolis-St. Paul
 Minnesota State Highway 100, Minneapolis-St. Paul (now truncated, never all-expressway)

Mississippi 
 Interstate 220, Jackson

Missouri 
 Interstate 435, Kansas City (second-longest beltway in the United States)
 Interstate 255/Interstate 270, St. Louis

Nebraska 
 Interstate 680, partial beltway around the Omaha-Council Bluffs metropolitan area

Nevada 
 Bruce Woodbury Beltway (Interstate 215/County Route 215), Las Vegas
 McCarran Boulevard (State Route 659), Reno

New Hampshire 
 Interstate 293 and Interstate 93, Manchester

New Jersey 

 Interstate 287, New York City
 Interstate 295, Trenton

New York 
 Interstate 287, Interstate 95, Interstate 278, New York State Route 440, and New Jersey Route 440 around Manhattan, New York City
 Interstate 278, Belt Parkway, Cross Island Parkway, Interstate 678, and Grand Central Parkway around Brooklyn, and Queens, New York City
 Interstate 290, Buffalo
 Interstate 590, Rochester
 Inner Loop, Rochester
 Interstate 481, Syracuse
 Interstate 787, Interstate 90, and Interstate 87 around Albany

North Carolina 
 Interstate 485 (Outerbelt), Charlotte (Finished June 5, 2015)

These ring roads are all unfinished except for I-240/I-40 serving Asheville, I-440/I-40 serving Raleigh, I-485 and I-277/I-77 and Charlotte Route 4.

Other Freeway loops
 Interstate 140, Wilmington (partial, unfinished)
 Interstate 240/Interstate 40, Asheville
 Does not fully function as a ring road since motorists cannot exit I-40 westbound to I-240 eastbound, nor I-240 westbound to I-40 eastbound.
 Interstate 440/Interstate 40 (Beltline), Raleigh
 Interstate 540/NC 540 (Outer Loop), Raleigh (unfinished)
 Interstate 840/Interstate 85/Interstate 73 (Greensboro Urban Loop), Greensboro (under construction)
 Interstate 274/Interstate 74 (Winston-Salem Beltway), Winston-Salem (under construction)
 Interstate 295/Interstate 95 (Fayetteville Outer Loop), Fayetteville (unfinished)
 US 64
 a 12.9 freeway stretch of the route in the city limits of Asheboro forms a partial loop around the central area of the city.

Nonfreeway loops
 Apex Peakway (under construction)
 Cary Parkway (partial loop)
 Charlotte Route 4
 Judd Parkway (Fuquay Varina) (under construction)
 Maynard Road (Cary inner loop)
 NC 67 (Silas Creek Parkway), forms a partial-controlled access partial loop around the western side of Winston-Salem, with most of the road carrying NC 67 between Peters Creek Parkway to Reynolda Road.
 US 264, Alternate U.S. 264 (Greenville Boulevard), NC 11 Bypass, forms a loop around Greenville, part of which is a freeway.
 NC 54, US 15, and US 501 form a partial-controlled access partial loop around Chapel Hill.

Ohio 
 Interstate 270, Columbus – Known in Columbus as "The Outerbelt"
 Interstate 90, Cleveland – The confluence of Interstate 90 and the northern termini of Interstates 71 and 77 bypassing Downtown Cleveland (locally known as the "Innerbelt")
 Interstate 271–Interstate 480, Cleveland – Large segments of these two freeways together form a partial beltway (locally known as the "Outerbelt")
 Interstate 275, Cincinnati
 Interstate 475 (entire length) and Interstate 75 exits 192–204, Toledo
 In the city of Akron, a beltway (albeit rectangular-shaped) is formed by three different Interstates – Interstate 77 travels alone on the eastern part (between exits 122–125), Interstate 76 travels alone on the western part (between exits 18–20), I-76 and I-77 share the northern part (signed as exits 20–23, using I-76 exit numbers), and Interstate 277 forms the entire southern part (4 miles)

Oregon 
 Interstate 205, Portland
 Interstate 405/Interstate 5 between the Fremont Bridge and the Marquam Bridge, Downtown Portland

Pennsylvania 
 Capital Beltway, includes portions of Interstate 81, Interstate 83, Pennsylvania Route 581, U.S. Route 11, and U.S. Route 322 around Harrisburg
 Lehigh Valley Thruway, including Interstate 78 and Pennsylvania Route 33 provide a beltway for the Lehigh Valley
 Pittsburgh/Allegheny County Belt System, Pittsburgh (set of six color-coded non-highway beltways)
 Interstate 576 (proposed), a proposed toll beltway route around Pittsburgh
 Interstate 70, Interstate 76, and Interstate 79 form a complete beltway around the Pittsburgh metropolitan area
 Interstate 476 and the Interstate 276 section of the Pennsylvania Turnpike provide a bypass of Philadelphia
 Interstate 81 and Interstate 476 around Scranton, Pennsylvania

Rhode Island 
 Interstate 295, Providence
 Downtown Ring Roads, Providence
 Downtown Circulator, Pawtucket

South Carolina 
 Interstate 20, Interstate 26, and Interstate 77 form a complete beltway around Columbia.
 Interstate 520 (Palmetto Parkway/South Carolina), N. Augusta.
 Interstate 526, (Mark Clark Expressway/James Island Expressway), Charleston (unfinished)

South Dakota 
 Interstate 229, Sioux Falls

Tennessee 
 Interstate 40 and Interstate 240, Memphis
 Interstate 269 Memphis Outer Beltway (partially built, remaining portions under construction)
 Interstate 440, Nashville
 Interstate 475, Knoxville Beltway Knoxville (planned)
 Interstate 840, Nashville
 State Route 155 (Briley Parkway), Nashville
 State Route 397 Mack Hatcher Memorial Parkway Franklin

Texas 

 Interstate 410 (Loop 410), San Antonio
 Loop 1604 (partial beltway on the north), San Antonio
 Interstate 610 (The 610 Loop), Houston
 Beltway 8 (Sam Houston Tollway), Houston
 State Highway 99 (Grand Parkway), Houston (unfinished)
 Interstate 635/Interstate 20 (LBJ), Dallas
 President George Bush Turnpike, Dallas
 State Highway Loop 12, Dallas
 Interstate 820 (Loop 820), Fort Worth
 State Highway 45, Austin (partial beltway around Austin)
 State Highway Loop 224, Nacogdoches
 State Highway Loop 250, Midland
 State Highway Loop 256, Palestine
 State Highway Loop 281, Longview
 State Highway Loop 286, Paris
 State Highway Loop 287, Lufkin
 State Highway Loop 288, Denton
 State Highway Loop 289, Lubbock
 State Highway Loop 304, Crockett
 State Highway Loop 322, Abilene
 State Highway Loop 323, Tyler
 State Highway Loop 335, Amarillo
 State Highway Loop 336, Conroe
 State Highway Loop 337, New Braunfels
 State Highway Loop 338, Odessa
 State Highway Loop 340, Waco
 State Highway Loop 375 (TransMt. Loop), El Paso
 State Highway Loop 485, Gladewater
 Belt Line Road, suburbs around Dallas

Utah 
 Interstate 215 (Belt Route), Salt Lake City

Vermont 
 Interstate 89/Vermont Route 289 (Chittenden County Circumferential Highway)

Virginia 
 Interstate 64/Interstate 664 (Hampton Roads Beltway)
 Interstate 495 (Capital Beltway), Washington, D.C.
 Interstate 295, partial beltway around Richmond
 State Route 262 (Staunton Beltway) Staunton

Washington 
 Interstate 405, Seattle

Wisconsin 
 In Milwaukee, Interstates 94 (exits 305–316) and 894 (entire route) form a beltway. Unlike most other beltways, it actually traverses the downtown area of the city it serves (see also: Marquette Interchange, and Zoo Interchange).
 West Beltline Highway – U.S. Route 12/U.S. Route 18 (Madison)
 U.S. Route 41/Interstate 41, U.S. Route 10 and State Trunk Highway 441 form a beltway in Appleton.
 Interstates 41, 43, and State Trunk Highway 172 form a beltway in Green Bay.
 Interstate 94, US 18, State Trunk Highway 59, State Trunk Highway 164, and State Trunk Highway 318 form a bypass beltway in Waukesha.

South America

Argentina 
 Avenida General Paz, Buenos Aires
 Avenida de Circunvalacion, Córdoba
 Avenida de Circunvalacion 25 de Mayo, Rosario
 Avenida de Circunvalacion, Santa Fe
 Avenida de Circunvalacion, San Juan

Brazil 

 Rodoanel Mário Covas, São Paulo
 Arco Metropolitano do Rio de Janeiro, Rio de Janeiro
 Anel Viário José Magalhães Teixeira, Campinas
 Avenida do Contorno, Feira de Santana
 Anel Viário Norte (SP-328), Ribeirão Preto
 Anel Viário Sul (SP-333), Ribeirão Preto
 Anel Rodoviário (BR-262), Belo Horizonte
 Contorno Oeste, Boa Vista

Chile 
 Américo Vespucio Avenue, Santiago

See also 
List of longest ring roads

References 

Lists of roads
Road transport-related lists